Antonia Zegers (born 29 June 1972) is a Chilean actress. She has an extensive career in cinema, with participation in some of the most awarded Chilean films such as Tony Manero (2008), Post mortem (2010), La vida de los peces (2010), No (2012), El club (2015), and A Fantastic Woman (2017), winner of the Academy Award for Best Foreign Language Film.

Biography and career 
Daughter of the prominent gynecologist Fernando Zegers Hochschild and Mónica Oportot Salbach, an adventurous Buddhist photographer. She studied at the Saint George's school in Santiago, and later entered the Gustavo Meza Theater School, currently the Teatro Imagen. She has a younger sister, Emilia.

She has made her career on Chilean National Television in telenovelas such as Iorana, La Fiera, Romané, Pampa Illusion, El circo de las Montini, Puertas adentro, Los Pincheira, Amor por accidente among others. She has said that her favorite soap opera roles have been Asunción in Los Pincheira and María Jacobé in Romané.

In cinema, Antonia Zegers made her debut in 1995, in the film by Christine Lucas En tu casa a las ocho. Since then, she has participated in a dozen films, among them, in almost all of Pablo Larraín's and also in those of some other well-known Chilean directors, such as Matías Bize or Marialy Rivas. She was awarded the Havana Star Prize for Best Actress by the 19th Havana Film Festival New York for her work in Los Perros.

Among the plays in which she has acted stand out Provincia Kapital, Pecados, Madre, Numancia and Fin del eclipse.

Personal life 
She was in a relationship with actor Ricardo Fernández between 2001 and 2004.

She met the film director Pablo Larraín in 2006, and they got married in 2008. They have been separated since the end of 2014. The couple has two children: Juana and Pascual.

Selected filmography

References

External links 

1972 births
Living people
Chilean film actresses
20th-century Chilean actresses
21st-century Chilean actresses
Actresses from Santiago
Chilean people of Dutch descent
Chilean people of German descent